Io con te non ci sto più (also known as I'm Not Living With You Anymore, Enough Is Enough, Happy End and I'm Not Staying With You Anymore) is a 1983 Italian romantic comedy-drama film  written and directed by Gianni Amico and starring  Monica Guerritore and Victor Cavallo. It was screened in the "Venice Night" section at the 40th edition of the Venice International Film Festival.

Plot

Cast 

Monica Guerritore as Clara
 Victor Cavallo as Marco
 Coralla Maiuri as Tina
  Claudio Remondi 
 Carlo Monni
  Silvio Vannucci

See also
 List of Italian films of 1983

References

External links

1983 romantic comedy films
1983 films
Italian romantic comedy films
1980s Italian-language films
1980s Italian films